Athula (IAST: Atula) was a Sanskrit-language poet from the Mushika Kingdom in present-day Kerala, India. He composed the Mushika-vamsa, a mahakavya (epic poem) on the ruling dynasty of the kingdom.

References

Sanskrit poets